Andris Keišs (born 26 November 1974) is a Latvian actor. In the theatre, he has appeared in several plays of Alvis Hermanis and Māra Ķimele. He has also taken part in several films.

In 2005 he received the Union of Latvian Theatre Workers best actor award and has won the Lielais Kristaps award four times (2000, 2012, 2015 and 2016), more than any other actor.

Filmography

References

External links

Andris Keišs at Jaunais Rīga Teātris (New Theater of Riga) homepage

1974 births
Living people
Latvian male television actors
Latvian male film actors
Latvian male stage actors
Lielais Kristaps Award winners
20th-century Latvian male actors
21st-century Latvian male actors